Trinity National Forest was established as the Trinity Forest Reserve by the U.S. Forest Service in California on April 26, 1905 with . It became a National Forest on March 4, 1907. On July 1, 1908 it gave up some acreage to California National Forest. In 1954 it was combined administratively with Shasta National Forest to create Shasta-Trinity National Forest. Trinity National Forest is located overwhelmingly in Trinity County, which has 89.46% of its acreage. In descending order of land area the rest of the counties are Tehama with 7.37%, Shasta with 2.93%, and Humboldt with 0.23%. There are local ranger district offices in Hayfork and Weaverville. Its administrative offices reside in Redding, as part of the combined Shasta-Trinity National Forest. As of 30 September 2008, the Forest has an area of 1,043,677 acres (4,223.61 km²), comprising 47.23% of the combined Shasta-Trinity's total 2,209,832 acres (8,942.87 km²).

References

External links
Forest History Society
Listing of the National Forests of the United States and Their Dates (from the Forest History Society website) Text from Davis, Richard C., ed. Encyclopedia of American Forest and Conservation History. New York: Macmillan Publishing Company for the Forest History Society, 1983. Vol. II, pp. 743-788.

Former National Forests of California
Protected areas of Humboldt County, California
Protected areas of Shasta County, California
Protected areas of Tehama County, California
Protected areas of Trinity County, California
Shasta-Trinity National Forest
1907 establishments in California
Protected areas established in 1907
1954 disestablishments in California
Protected areas disestablished in 1954